The year 1997 is the third year in the history of Fighting Network Rings, a mixed martial arts promotion based in Japan. In 1997 Fighting Network Rings held nine events beginning with, Rings: Battle Dimensions Tournament 1996 Final.

Events list

Rings: Battle Dimensions Tournament 1996 Final

Rings: Battle Dimensions Tournament 1996 Final was an event held on January 1, 1997.

Results

Rings: Budokan Hall 1997

Rings: Budokan Hall 1997 was an event held on January 22, 1997, at Budokan Hall in Tokyo, Japan.

Results

Rings Holland: The Final Challenge

Rings Holland: The Final Challenge was an event held on February 2, 1997, at The Sport Hall Zuid in Amsterdam, North Holland, Netherlands.

Results

Rings: Extension Fighting 2

Rings: Extension Fighting 2 was an event held on April 22, 1997, in Japan.

Results

Rings: Extension Fighting 4

Rings: Extension Fighting 4 was an event held on June 21, 1997, in Tokyo, Japan.

Results

Rings Holland: Utrecht at War

Rings Holland: Utrecht at War was an event held on June 29, 1997, in Utrecht, Netherlands.

Results

Rings: Extension Fighting 7

Rings: Extension Fighting 7 was an event held on September 26, 1997, in Japan.

Results

Rings: Mega Battle Tournament 1997 Semifinal 1

Rings: Mega Battle Tournament 1997 Semifinal was an event held on October 25, 1997, in Japan.

Results

Rings: Mega Battle Tournament 1997 Semifinal

Rings: Mega Battle Tournament 1997 Semifinal was an event held on December 23, 1997, in Japan.

Results

See also 
 Fighting Network Rings
 List of Fighting Network Rings events

References

Fighting Network Rings events
1997 in mixed martial arts